"Walk On By" is a song composed by Burt Bacharach, with lyrics by Hal David, for singer Dionne Warwick in 1963. The song peaked at number 6 on the US Billboard Hot 100 and number 1 on the Cash Box Rhythm and Blues Chart In June 1964 and was nominated for a 1965 Grammy Award for the Best Rhythm and Blues Recording. Isaac Hayes recorded the song five years later, in 1969, and reached number 30 on the Hot 100 chart and number 13 in the R&B charts with his version. "Walk On By" has since charted numerous times in various countries, with wildly different arrangements.

Dionne Warwick original version (1964)

The original version of "Walk On By" by Dionne Warwick was recorded at Bell Sound Studios in New York City, the same December 1963 session that yielded her hit "Anyone Who Had a Heart". "Walk On By" was the follow-up to that single, released in April 1964 and reaching number 6 on the U.S. Billboard Hot 100 and number 1 on the Cashboxs R&B chart. (Billboard did not print rhythm and blues charts during 1964, the year of the song's peak performance.) The song also reached the top 10 in a run on Billboard's easy listening survey. The song was ranked number 51 on the Rolling Stone list of The 500 Greatest Songs of All Time, the second highest song by a solo female on the list after "Respect" by Aretha Franklin.  "Walk On By" became Warwick's second international million seller following "Anyone Who Had A Heart" in January 1964.

 played on this recording as did session bassist Russ Savakus.  Other musicians included Artie Butler on organ, Paul Griffin on piano, Irwin Markowitz and Ernie Royal on trumpet, Bill Suyker and Allen Hanlon on guitar, Max Pollikoff, Charles McCracken, Eugene Orloff, Julius Held, and George Ockner on violin, Harold Coletta on viola, Lucien Schmit on cello, Paul Winter on saxophone, and George Devens on percussion.

Warwick also recorded a German version of the song, titled "Geh vorbei".

Charts
Weekly charts

Year-end charts

Certifications

Bobby Kris and the Imperials version (1965)
The Toronto folk-rock group Bobby Kris and the Imperials released a fairly straight-ahead cover version in late 1965.  The single became a major hit in Canada, reaching number 8 in early 1966, but "Walk On By" was the band's only hit.

Charts

Isaac Hayes version (1969)

Funk/soul musician Isaac Hayes released a cover version of "Walk on By" in 1969 for his studio album Hot Buttered Soul and transformed the song into a twelve-minute funk vamp. Edited for single release down to under 5 minutes, this single reached number 30 on the U.S. Billboard Hot 100 chart. This version was also featured in the film Dead Presidents. His version was ranked No. 312 in the 2021 edition of "Top 500 Songs of All Time" by Rolling Stone Magazine.

Samples

Hayes's version was sampled in 1992 by Compton's Most Wanted in "Hood Took Me Under", in 1994 by The Notorious B.I.G. in "Warning", in 1995 by 2Pac in "Me Against The World", in 1998 by McGruff in "Harlem Kidz Get Biz", in 1999 by MF DOOM in "Dead Bent", in 2000 by Wu-Tang Clan in "I Can't Go to Sleep", in 1996 by Hooverphonic in "2 Wicky", in 2005 by Hip Hop Pantsula in "Let Me Be", from his album YBA 2 NW, and in R&B singer Beyoncé's 2016 song "6 Inch".

Charts

Gloria Gaynor version (1975)

Gloria Gaynor released her disco version on her 1975 album, Experience Gloria Gaynor. It became a hit in South Africa during the fall of the year, reaching #12, and #17 in Germany.

Charts

The Stranglers version (1978)

In 1978, the Stranglers recorded a six minute version of "Walk on By" (with extended organ and guitar solos) that hit No. 21 on the UK Singles Chart. The video for the Stranglers' version was based on the 1966 movie "Blowup" and was filmed in the same location as the movie, Maryon Park in London. Chart performance may have been impaired by the fact that an E.P. featuring the song had been given away with the first 75,000 copies of their album Black and White.

Charts

Average White Band version (1979)
The Average White Band cut a lightly disco-tinged version (featuring reggae and funk underpinnings) that charted in 1979.  

Charts

D-Train version (1982)
In 1982, "Walk on By" was covered by the funk duo D-Train who had a UK and U.S. R&B/dance hit with the song in a boogie/funk version.

Charts

Jo Jo Zep version (1983)
In 1983, Australian group Jo Jo Zep covered "Walk on By" in a slow, moody version that featured electronics and synthesisers. The song was lifted from the band's seventh studio album, Cha. The track was a minor hit in Australia, peaking at number 55, but was a major hit in New Zealand, hitting number 6.

Charts

Melissa Manchester version (1989)
In 1989, "Walk On By" was covered by singer Melissa Manchester. Her version of the song hit number 6 on the Billboard Adult Contemporary chart.

Charts

Sybil version (1990)

In 1990, American singer Sybil, who had scored her biggest hit a year prior with a cover of Warwick's "Don't Make Me Over", also scored a U.S. and UK hit with "Walk On By".

Track listingUS, 7" Vinyl singleA1: "Walk On By" (Club Mix) – 7:15
A2: "Walk On By" (Radio) – 4:04
B1: "Here Comes My Love" (Vocal Mix) – 3:48
B2: "Here Comes My Love" (Instrumental) – 3:58UK, CD Maxi single "Walk On By" (Club Mix) – 7:15
 "Bad Beats Suite" (Radio) – 3:12
 "Walk On By" (Dub Version) – 3:21

Charts

Weekly charts

Year-end charts

Gabrielle version (1997)

In 1997, UK singer Gabrielle released her version of "Walk on By" as the fifth and final single from her studio album, Gabrielle. It reached number 7 on the UK Singles Chart.

A reviewer from Music Week rated the track five out of five, adding that the song "is given a fine treatment by Gabrielle, whose voice fits perfectly. A guaranteed radio biggie, too."

Track listings

Charts

Cyndi Lauper version (2003)
"Walk on By" was the first single from Cyndi Lauper's 2003 covers album, At Last. It was also included on Lauper's 2004 DVD Live at Last. It was released as a promo only. Remixes of the song reached number 10 on the U.S. dance chart.

Formats and track listingsUS Promotional 12" "Walk On By" (S.A.F.'s Walk to the Dance Floor Club Mix) – 8:12
 "Walk On By" (S.A.F.'s Walk to the Dance Floor Dub Mix) – 8:12US Promotional 12" (Remix) "Walk On By" (Eddie X Club Mix) – 10:53
 "Walk On By" (Eddie X Dub Mix) – 7:52US Promotional CD'''
 "Walk On By" (Live Version) – 3:26
 "Walk On By" (Album Version) – 4:31
 "Walk On By" (Tony Moran Mix) – 4:31

Charts

Seal version (2005)
Seal released a version of "Walk On By" as a single in January 2005. Though the song did not chart in his native UK, it made the lower reaches of the charts in several European countries.

Charts

Spitting Image version (1990)
After the resignation of Margaret Thatcher in 1990, the British satirical television programme Spitting Image'' adapted the lyrics of the song to highlight the large number of homeless people living on the street during her premiership.

References

External links
 
 

1963 songs
1964 singles
1969 singles
1997 singles
2003 singles
2005 singles
Songs with lyrics by Hal David
Songs with music by Burt Bacharach
Dionne Warwick songs
Isaac Hayes songs
The Stranglers songs
D Train (entertainer) songs
Sybil (singer) songs
Gabrielle (singer) songs
Jo Jo Zep & The Falcons songs
Cyndi Lauper songs
Seal (musician) songs
Aretha Franklin songs
The Beach Boys songs
Gloria Gaynor songs
Kiki Dee songs
We Five songs
Scepter Records singles
Grammy Hall of Fame Award recipients
Helen Shapiro songs
Torch songs
A&M Records singles
Go! Beat singles
Prelude Records (record label) singles
MGM Records singles
Pete Waterman Entertainment singles
United Artists Records singles
Universal Music Group singles
Average White Band songs